James Graham Davie (7 September 1922 – 31 January 1984) was a Scottish footballer who played for Kilmarnock, Preston North End, Northampton Town, Shrewsbury Town and Dumbarton.

References

1922 births
Scottish footballers
Dumbarton F.C. players
Kilmarnock F.C. players
Scottish Football League players
1984 deaths
Preston North End F.C. players
Northampton Town F.C. players
Shrewsbury Town F.C. players
Bridgeton Waverley F.C. players
Scottish Junior Football Association players
English Football League players
Association football wing halves
Sportspeople from Cambuslang
Footballers from South Lanarkshire